(VNF) is the French navigation authority responsible for the management of the majority of France's inland waterways network and the associated facilities—towpaths, commercial and leisure ports, lock-keeper's houses and other structures. VNF was established in 1991 and took over the responsibility for all waterways from the National Office of Navigation in 1993. It is a public body and is under the control of the Minister of Ecology, Energy, Sustainable Development and Territorial Development.  The headquarters of VNF are in Béthune, Pas-de-Calais with local offices throughout France.

French waterways network 

Two significant waterways which are not under VNF's control are the navigable sections of the River Somme and the Brittany Canals, which are both under local management, and neither is the River Lot in Aquitaine.

Enhancements 

Approximately 20% of the network is suitable for commercial boats of over 1000 tonnes and the VNF has an ongoing programme of maintenance and modernisation to increase depth of waterways, widths of locks and headroom under bridges to support France's strategy of encouraging freight onto water as part of her sustainable development programme—a survey by Price Waterhouse Coopers showed that 75% of French companies were willing to switch to barge transport.

A major current initiative is the cross-border Seine–Nord Europe Canal project, connecting the Seine and the Scheldt, which will provide a continuous wide-gauge navigation from Le Havre to Antwerp.

See also
List of rivers of France
List of canals in France

References

External links
VNF website 

Water transport in France
Government-owned companies of France
Inland waterway authorities
Transport authorities in France